Edakkad is part of the Kannur Municipal Corporation in Kannur District of Kerala state, in India.

History

Edakkad grama panchayat of Kannur in ancient times was referred to as Madhya-adavi (in Sanskrit Madhya means middle and Adavi means forest). Similarly Eda means middle and kadu means forest. Thus the Malayalam derivative "Edakkad" is an adaptation of its original Sanskrit name. Edakkad also was historically referred to as Prashnamargapuram (town of Prashnamargam treatise in horary astrology) . This honorary name evolved due to the seminal horary astrological treatise called Prashna Margam being written by Panakkattu Namboodiri (1624-1694 A.D.) around 1649 A.D. at the Lord Narasimha temple (Edakkadappan temple) in this panchayat. The author's first disciple, according to tradition, was a poet known as Kukaniyal,  his real name was Sankaran kaniyar who belonged to the Kaniyar community who lived in his family house (Kaniyan Kandiyil) also situated in Edakkad. Kukaniyal of Edakkad is accredited to have later written another astrological treatise Prashna-Ritti.

Sree Oorpazhachi Kavu

A prominent temple in the Edakkad grama panchayat is the Sree Oorpazhachi Kavu (Ooril Pazhakiya Eachil Kavu or Ooril Pazhakiya Achi Kavu) situated at Nadal. The name of this temple renders itself to two etymological interpretations. The former meaning pazhakiya (ancient) kavu (grove) surrounded by Eachil (a herb) and the latter meaning pazhakiya (ancient) achi (mother goddess) kavu (grove). Irrespective of the interpretation of Oorpazachi Kavu, it is the presence of this temple at Edakkad that imparts historical significance to the area. One finds reference to this famous temple in the Malabar Manual by William Logan, the British collector of Malabar. The main deity at Oorpazhachikavu is Oorpazhachi Dhaivam  locally known as 'dhaivathareeswaran' who was the deified feudal Nair warrior 'Meloor Dayarappan'. North Malabar Folklore has in its collection of traditional songs described the ferocity of Meloor Dayarappan as the 'veeran' [hero] who had killed sixty four within the age of thirtysix including his teacher who beat him during teaching even when Meloor Dayarappan was a boy. The lengthy lore known as 'Oorpazhachi Thottam' further narrates that Meloor Dayarappan with his dearest friend Vettakorumakan and twelve thousand friends resided at Oorpazhachi Kaav where Meloor Dayarappan ruled as a kshathriya king for twelve years over a territory extending from ancient Kannur to Wayanad.Meloor dayarappan, Khshethrapalan, Veerabhadran, and Vettakorumakan were deified nair warriors who were friends. They occupy place among   the thirty five important 'Theyyams' known collectively as 'Muppathaivar' [The thirtyfive] in the Theyyam FolkLore of northernmost Malabar.   The Folklore scholars C M S Chanthera, Professor Vishnu namboothiri, the famous Theyyam performer Manakkadan Gurikkal has written about this Deity and on the lengthy and extensive 'OorpazhachiThottam'. according to Professor K.K.N. Kurupp Vice-Chancellor Calicut university 'Oorpazhachi Dhaivam' presided over 18000 sthanams [seats] in Kolathunaad alone. Dr.Sanjeevan Azhikode son of C M S Chanthera also has done extensive study of caste connotations in the Theyyam ambit and states that the title as 'The ruling warrior' was conferred on Meloor Dayarappan by the rulers of 'Nediyirippu swaroopam'known later as the  Zamorins of calicut area.

Ooralar

In the pre-British era and to some extent through the British era local political and judicial administrations were performed through hereditary village assemblies and temple committees called Ooralar. The term Oor means village and Ooraalan (Ooraalar, if joint partnership) means master (masters) or proprietor in these villages. The Sree Oorpazachi Kavu temple was the seat of such a socio-political body that enjoyed partial autonomy and administered the region. Nine prominent Nambiar families were Ooraalar and constituted the village and temple assembly that arbitrated local administration. They belonged to a further endogamous denomination among Nambiars called Randu Illam Vargam (As they derive their ancestry from Mullapalli Illom and Velloor Illom).

After the Land Reforms Ordinance was enacted by Kerala State Government and the breaking of Janmi- kudiyan (feudal tenancy relationship) system Sree Oorpazhachi Kavu and the Ooralar families do not have any socio-political influence in the area. However the eldest-male from these matrilineal families still perform their role as de facto Ooralar in the Sree Oorpazhachi Kavu temple administration during ceremonial events. Like most villages in Malabar, Edakkad has also suffered extensively during the invasion of Tipu Sultan.

Edakkad Bathakka

Traditionally the Edakkad area was famous for its local variety / landrace of  watermelon (Citrullus lanatus, Family Cucurbitaceae)  referred to as Edakkad Bathakka.

Demographics

This grama panchayat has a mixed population of the Hindus (mainly Thiyyas and Nambiars) and a minority Muslim population.

Transportation

The road to the east connects to Mysore and Bangalore and South connects to Thiruvananthapuram via Calicut - Thrissure - Cochin and Alappuzha. The nearest railway station is Thalassery and Kannur Main on Mangalore-Palakkad line (NH 66). There are airports at Kannur , Calicut and Mangalore International Airport.

Local information
Sathyan Edakkad is a Policeman of Kerala Tourism Police. He is a well known historian and an author. He has written and published three books. 1. Vasco da Gama and the Unknown Facts of History. 2. Vasco da Gamayum Charithrathile Kaanaappurangalum (Malayalam) 
3. Kannur; kaanaan ariyan.(Malayalam). He has got many Awards.

Apart from the Sree oorpazachi Kavu and Edakkadappan temples Sree Ganapathy temple in the west of Edakkad and Indery Ambalam near Edakkad bazaar are other popular destinations of Hindu worship. There is also an ancient mosque at Edakkad bazaar. The panchayat also has a Saliya-theruvu (weaver's street) where traditional weaving is still performed in several households to date.

Educational institutions

1. There are two primary schools at Edakkad. There are secondary schools at Kadachira and Thottada (within Edakkad Block).

2. Govt. Polytechnic college is situated in Thottada. This college is under the department of technical education of Kerala and has different branches such as Civil, Mechanical, Electrical, Electronics, textile and Wood technology. The Diploma is awarded by Technical education Board, Kerala.

3. The Edakkad block also has one prestigious industrial training institute under state government.

4.  one of the most famous sree Balabhadra worshiped temple named sree poothrikovil temple  is also positioned in the same jurisdiction which is the second temple in India of the same lord.

Politics
Edakkad belongs to Kannur Assembly constituency is part of Kannur (Lok Sabha constituency).

See also
 Edakkad (State Assembly constituency)

References

External links
 Edakkad website
History of Edakkad Nambiar
https://m.youtube.com/watch?v=fQpn73Zy7AQ&feature=youtu.be

Thalassery road, Kannur